"Charlie Big Potato" is the first single taken from British rock band Skunk Anansie's third studio album, Post Orgasmic Chill (1999). The single came after the band switched record labels moving away from the independent label One Little Indian onto Virgin Records. It was released on 1 March 1999, almost two years after their previous single. The reached number 17 on the UK Singles Chart and number three in Iceland.

CD1 came with an interactive element featuring the video and CD 2 came with three specially produced polaroid photographs of the band. The song was a favourite at festivals and Skin often performs a slower version of the song at her solo gigs. It was also featured in the 2000 movie Hollow Man.

Music video
The bizarre video, directed by Giuseppe Capotondi, shows the band appearing in different locations, with Skin waking up in a toilet, followed by a boy beginning to realise that his nightmares have become real.

Track listings
CD single – CD1

CD single – CD2

Charts

References

1999 singles
Skunk Anansie songs
1999 songs
Virgin Records singles
Songs written by Skin (musician)
Songs written by Len Arran
Music videos directed by Giuseppe Capotondi